is a 2004 Japanese varsity novel written by Tomihiko Morimi and published by Ohta Publishing. Its first-person narrator is an unnamed upperclassman at Kyoto University reminiscing on the misadventures of his previous years of campus life, with each of the four chapters taking place in parallel universes in which he is enrolled in a different student society.

A sequel, was published in 2020, which combines the characters of The Tatami Galaxy with the plot of Makoto Ueda's play and film Summer Time Machine Blues. English translations of both novels by Emily Balistrieri are planned for publication by HarperCollins in December 2022 and September 2023, respectively.

The Tatami Galaxy was adapted into an 11-episode anime television series produced by Madhouse and directed by Masaaki Yuasa, which aired on Fuji TV's late-night Noitamina programming block in 2010. The adaptation was critically acclaimed, winning the 2010 Japan Media Arts Festival Grand Prize in the Animation Division and the 2011 Tokyo Anime Award in the Television Category. An original net animation adaptation of The Tatami Time Machine Blues produced by Science Saru premiered in September 2022 on Disney+.

Plot
The Tatami Galaxy follows an unnamed third-year student at Kyoto University, using parallel universes as a plot device to explore how his life would have differed had he joined a particular student society (called a "circle" in Japan). The majority of the series' episodes follow the same basic structure: the protagonist joins a circle as a freshman, but is disillusioned when the activity does not lead to the idealized "rose-colored campus life" he dreamed of. He meets Ozu, another student, whose encouragement sets him on a mission of dubious morality. He becomes close to Akashi, a second year engineering student, and makes a promise to her, usually of and within a romantic subtext. He encounters a fortune teller, who cryptically informs him of an opportunity "dangling" in front of his eyes; this prompts him to remember a mochiguman keychain lost by Akashi and recovered by the protagonist, which he leaves hanging from a pull switch in his apartment and perpetually forgets to return to her. The dubious mission ends poorly for the protagonist, causing him to bemoan the state of his life and wonder how things would have differed had he joined a different circle. Time rewinds, and the subsequent episode depicts the protagonist once again as a freshman, joining a different circle.

Characters

An unnamed college student in Kyoto reflecting on his past two years of college life. He entered college with dreams of finding a "rose-colored campus life" and the love of a "raven-haired maiden," but is continually disillusioned when he is unable to achieve this ideal. He is shy, self-regarding, and easily manipulated by others.

A troublemaking student who claims he is bound to the protagonist by the black thread of fate, and who often encourages the protagonist to make morally questionable choices. His mischievous nature is personified in his pale and unsettling appearance, resembling a yōkai.

An engineering student who is commonly (but not always) the center of the protagonist's affections, and who often appears in the same club that the protagonist joins. She has a cold and rational personality, but shows hints of softness and helpfulness towards the protagonist. She suffers from a severe fear of moths.

Though he claims be a god of matchmaking in the first episode, Higuchi—also referred to as "Master Higuchi", or simply "the Master" (Shishō)—is an eighth-year super senior living in the same dorm as the protagonist. He has a wise, distant, and nonchalant personality, and is always seen wearing a yukata. Higuchi, Hanuki, the ramen stall owner, and Jōgasaki were formerly classmates; Higuchi has an ongoing rivalry with the lattermost, called the "proxy-proxy war".

An eighth-year super senior and president of the movie circle. Though handsome and popular, he is privately lecherous and owns a love doll named Kaori. He often takes an antagonistic role relative to the protagonist, and is often assisted by Ozu in a way that is detrimental to the protagonist's progress, in spite of the fact that Ozu is helping the protagonist at the same time. Has an ongoing rivalry with Higuchi.

A dental hygienist and former classmate of Higuchi and Jōgasaki. A frequent drinker, she drastically loses her sense of judgement when inebriated; aware of this, she is cautious about choosing who she goes drinking with.

A love doll owned by Jōgasaki.

A subordinate in the film circle who secretly leads the Secret Society Lucky Cat Chinese Restaurant.

A person the protagonist believes to be an elegant girl with whom he exchanges letters. She is actually Akashi, who writes the letters to the protagonist as a prank at Ozu's behest.

An old woman who appears in every episode, almost always along Kiyamachi Street, and tells the protagonist (often but not always at his behest) to seize the opportunities before him (or a variation thereof). She increases the price for her services by ¥1000 in each subsequent episode.

The owner of the ramen shop the protagonist favors. He is mostly silent, occasionally putting in a short, new insight into the protagonist's current conversations or problems. He occasionally takes on a more active role in the protagonist's adventures, always a helpful one.

A cowboy representing the protagonist's libido, who constantly bickers with the protagonist.

Media

Novel
The Tatami Galaxy was first published in Japanese in December 2004 as a tankōbon by Ohta Publishing; it was republished in March 2008 as a bunkoban by Kadokawa Shoten. The novel was published in Korean by Viche in August 2008, in traditional Chinese by China Times Publishing in December 2009, and in simplified Chinese by Shanghai People's Publishing House in August 2010.

Morimi's 2006 novel The Night Is Short, Walk On Girl serves as a spiritual successor to Tatami Galaxy, with a shared setting and some recurring characters. The novel was published in English in the United States in 2019 by Yen Press.

The Tatami Galaxy received a sequel, titled , inspired by Makoto Ueda's stage play and film Summer Time Machine Blues. It was published in Japan on July 29, 2020.

Both The Tatami Galaxy and The Tatami Time Machine Blues are licensed for publication in the United States by HarperCollins, and will be published in December 2022 and summer 2023, respectively.

Anime
An anime television series adaptation of The Tatami Galaxy was produced by Madhouse, with Masaaki Yuasa as director, series composition by Makoto Ueda, teleplays by Ueda and Yuasa, and music by Michiru Ōshima. The series premiered on April 22, 2010, as a part of Fuji TV's Noitamina programming block.

Three seven-minute animated shorts were included with the Japanese DVD and Blu-ray Disc releases of the series. The first DVD/BD volume was released on August 20, 2010, and contained the first short; the second and third shorts were released on the third and fourth DVD/BD volumes on October 22, 2010, and November 26, 2010, respectively.

In North America, the series was simulcast by Funimation, and it was first licensed in United Kingdom by Beez Entertainment. In June 2019, Funimation announced the release of the series on Blu-ray and DVD with subtitles only on September 3.

On August 12, 2021, it was announced that The Tatami Time Machine Blues novel would be receiving an anime adaptation. The series, later revealed to be an original net animation (ONA), is produced by Science Saru, directed by Shingo Natsume and written for television by Makoto Ueda, with character designs by Yusuke Nakamura, music composed by Michiru Ōshima, and the majority of the original Japanese voice cast reprising their roles. The 6-episode series premiered exclusively on Disney+ in Japan on September 14, 2022, while a theatrical compilation film version followed on September 30. The Disney+ release of the series includes an original episode that was not covered by the theatrical compilation, which was released on October 12, 2022 along with the series finale. The series was also released in the U.S. on November 9, 2022. It was slated to appear on Disney+, but was unexpectedly moved over to Hulu with no promotion or announcement. Asian Kung-Fu Generation performed the theme song "Demachiyanagi Parallel Universe".

Episode list

Film

Night Is Short, Walk On Girl, a feature film and spiritual sequel to The Tatami Galaxy, based on the novel of the same name, was released by Toho on April 7, 2017.

Reception
The Tatami Galaxy won the grand prize in the animation category at the 14th Japan Media Arts Festival on December 8, 2010, making it the first television series to win the award, with the jury describing the series in their justification as a "richly expressive work that turns the limitations of TV on its head" and complimenting its "unique scene layouts, characters' actions and color scheme." It also won the Television Category award at the 10th Tokyo Anime Awards in 2011.

In 2019, Polygon staff named The Tatami Galaxy as one of the best anime of the 2010s; writer Julia Lee commented, "This is my all-time favorite anime. It's wordy, it's fun, and it has this great, over exaggerated art style". In a 2019 Forbes article about the best anime of the 2010s decade, Lauren Orsini considered it to be one of the five best anime of 2010; she wrote, "With thoughtful wordplay and deep insight into the human condition, this Bildungsroman bridges fantasy and reality with a cast of characters just on the other side of absurd".

Awards

References

External links

Official Japanese website of the television series 
Detailed posts on individual episodes at AniPages Daily
Review of the program at Twitch Film

2004 Japanese novels
2020 Japanese novels
2022 anime ONAs
Anime and manga about parallel universes
Anime and manga based on novels
Campus novels
Dark comedy anime and manga
First-person narrative novels
Funimation
Kadokawa Dwango franchises
Kadokawa Shoten
Kyoto in fiction
Madhouse (company)
Noitamina
Novels set in Japan
Ohta Publishing
Psychological anime and manga
Romantic comedy anime and manga
Science Saru
Television shows set in Japan
Time loop anime and manga